Lin Yi-yin (born 11 May 1973) is a Taiwanese archer. She competed at the 1992 Summer Olympics, the 1996 Summer Olympics and the 2000 Summer Olympics.

References

1973 births
Living people
Taiwanese female archers
Olympic archers of Taiwan
Archers at the 1992 Summer Olympics
Archers at the 1996 Summer Olympics
Archers at the 2000 Summer Olympics
Place of birth missing (living people)
Archers at the 1994 Asian Games
Archers at the 1998 Asian Games
Asian Games competitors for Chinese Taipei
20th-century Taiwanese women